TOTEP (erroneously spelled out on the spine of physical releases as The One True EP) is the third extended play by British band Kero Kero Bonito, self-released on 20 February 2018. The EP marks a departure from the "sunny" electropop of previous releases in favor of a "grungier, guitar-heavy style, full of crunching distortion and glitched out noise." The EP was preceded by the single "Only Acting", which was later featured on the band's second studio album, Time 'n' Place (2018).

Critical reception
Anna Gace of Spin opined that the songs on the EP "feel a bit sketched-in, but they also suggest that KKB see a future where they're not just cranking out delightfully goofy bubblegum dance-pop." James Rettig of Stereogum wrote, "The new songs cycle through grunge-y, power-poppy, and dreamy, and they're all great and demonstrate the versatility of KKB's sound."

Following the group's signing to Polyvinyl Records, the EP was issued physically for the first time and charted at #6 on the Top Heatseekers chart.

Track listing

All songs written by Gus Lobban.

Personnel
Credits adapted from Kero Kero Bonito's official website.

Kero Kero Bonito
 Sarah Midori Perry – vocals
 Gus Lobban – drums, production
 Jamie Bulled – bass

Additional musicians
 James Rowland – guitar, noise
 The Parakeets (Cecile Believe, z & Oscar) – backing vocals

Technical
 Jimmy Robertson – recording
 Andy Ramsay – engineering
 Anthony Lim – additional mixing, mastering

Charts

References

2018 EPs
Kero Kero Bonito albums